The black-soil rises ctenotus (Ctenotus schevilli)  is a species of skink found in Queensland in Australia.

References

schevilli
Reptiles described in 1933
Taxa named by Arthur Loveridge